Milo I the Great (died 1102) was lord of Montlhéry from 1095 until his death. He was the son of Guy I of Montlhéry and Hodierna of Gometz.

The identity of his first wife is unknown. His second wife was Lithuise de Blois, Vicomtesse de Troyes, daughter of William Busac, Count of Soissons (c. 1084–1118).

Milo and Lithuise had at least nine children:
 Guy III Trousseau, lord of Montlhéry
 Thibaut
 Milo II (died 1118), lord of Montlhéry and Bray-sur-Seine, viscount of Troyes
 Adelaide
 Elizabeth (Isabella) of Montlhéry, married Thibaut of Dampierre.  Their son was Guy I of Dampierre.
 Emmeline of Montlhéry (died 1121), married Hugh II Bardoul, lord of Broyes
 Renaud of Montlhéry, Bishop of Troyes (1121–1122)
 Marguerite, married Manasses, Viscount of Sens.

Milo joined the Lombard contingent during the second wave of the First Crusade around 1100 together with his brother Guy II. He returned from the crusade "broken by the stress" and "devoid of all bodily strength".

See also
 The Houses of Montlhéry and Le Puiset

References

Sources

Christians of the First Crusade
1102 deaths
Year of birth unknown
Christians of the Crusade of 1101